IFIS may refer to:

 International flag identification symbol, used to indicate characteristics of flags
 Intraoperative floppy iris syndrome, a medical condition